Sean or Shaun Riley may refer to:

Sean Riley (American football) (born 1974), American football player
Sean Riley (Coronation Street)
Sean Riley & The Slowriders, a Portuguese band
Sean Riley (playwright), playwright from South Australia
Sean Riley, host of World's Toughest Fixes
Sean Riley, a fictional character, father of Peyton Riley
Shawn Riley, musician in Rumpelstiltskin Grinder
Shaun Riley, protagonist in Shaun of the Dead, played by Simon Pegg

See also
Sean Reilly (disambiguation)
Shawn Reilly (disambiguation)